Tikhaya Bay (translated as "Quiet Bay") may refer to one of the following places.

A bay on Hooker Island, Franz Josef Land, Russia.
A bay and microdistrict in Vladivostok, Russia.